St. Matthew's Episcopal Church is an Episcopal Church at 20 Union Street in Hallowell, Maine. The church was built in 1860, and is part of the Hallowell Historic District defined in the National Register of Historic Places.

See also
 Hallowell Historic District
 List of National Historic Landmarks in Maine
 National Register of Historic Places listings in Maine

References

External links 
 St. Matthew's Episcopal Church

Churches completed in 1860
19th-century Episcopal church buildings
Episcopal church buildings in Maine
Churches in Kennebec County, Maine
Buildings and structures in Hallowell, Maine
National Register of Historic Places in Kennebec County, Maine